Dezsö Kertész (2 September 1890 – 18 October 1965) was a Hungarian film actor and director.

Kertész was born in Békés and died in Budapest at age 73.

Selected filmography
Actor
 The Village Rogue (1916)
 The Laughing Saskia (1916)
 Anna Karenina (1918)
 Number 111 (1919)
 Dracula's Death (1921)
 Vica the Canoeist (1933)
 The Hen-Pecked Husband (1938)
 Estélyi ruha kötelezö (1942)
 Changing the Guard (1942)
 Csalódás (1943)

Director
 Rumpelstilzchen (1923)
 General Babka (1930)

Bibliography

External links

1890s births
1965 deaths
People from Békés
Hungarian male film actors
Hungarian film directors
Hungarian male silent film actors
20th-century Hungarian male actors
Hungarian male stage actors